"Swear It Again" is a song by Irish boy band Westlife. The ballad was released on 19 April 1999 in the United Kingdom as the first single from their debut album, Westlife (1999). The song peaked at number one on the UK Singles Chart for two weeks, giving Westlife their first of 14 UK number-one singles. "Swear It Again" is Westlife's only single to have charted in the US, peaking at number 20 on the Billboard Hot 100 and ranking number 75 on the Billboard Hot 100 year-end chart in 2000.

The single has sold over 400,000 copies in the UK and has achieved gold status there. It is the band's fifth-best-selling single in combined sales and seventh-best-selling single in paid-for sales in the UK as of January 2019.

Background
In Westlife - Our Story the band recalled being "excited" hearing the demo of this song saying "Wow, this is a great song. It's a big chorus, great harmonies. This is exactly what we want to be recording".

"Swear It Again" is notable for being, along with "Flying Without Wings", one of the first two songs that Steve Mac wrote for both Westlife and Simon Cowell. The success of the two tracks led to Mac becoming Cowell's preferred producer and songwriter. It was revealed that Cowell let his father Eric listen to all of the songs recorded by the band for their debut album to decide what would be the album's lead single, with Eric choosing "Swear It Again". Significantly, Eric died of a heart attack during the week the single was released.

The song's B-side, "Forever", was a significant choice because, as originally recorded by Damage, it first alerted Cowell to the talent of Steve Mac and then led to the producer working with Westlife. It was composed in the traditional verse–chorus form in A major, with Filan and Feehily's vocal ranging from the chords of B3 to F5.

An exclusive live track version of the single was included in the Arista Records 25th anniversary compilation album in 2000.

Music video
The original version of the video was not released. Simon Cowell had spent £150,000 on it, didn't like it and ordered a re-shoot.

The remade British music video features the band members in a mini theatre and singing on a stage fitted with lighting panel flooring while they face a screen with black-and-white videos of their studio recording process. This version was directed by Wayne Isham and aired in May 1999. The video was shot at Pinewood Studios in March 1999. The video on YouTube has 71 million views as of May 2021.

The American music video features the band members at a car wash and subsequently washing a white car as they're singing the song. This version was directed by Nigel Dick and aired in June 2000. The American version of the video has 17 million views on YouTube as of July 2022.

Honours and awards

Track listings

UK CD1
 "Swear It Again" (radio edit) – 4:04
 "Forever" – 5:05
 CD-ROM (includes filmed interview with Ronan Keating + video clips)

UK CD2
 "Swear It Again" (radio edit) – 4:04
 "Swear It Again" (Rokstone mix) – 4:07
 "Ronan Keating Interviews Westlife" (audio) – 3:36

UK cassette single
 "Swear It Again" (radio edit) – 4:04
 "Forever" – 5:05
 "Ronan Keating Interviews Westlife" (audio) – 3:36

European CD single
 "Swear It Again" (radio edit) – 4:04
 "Forever" – 5:05

US CD and cassette single
 "Swear It Again" – 4:06
 Snippets from Westlife

Australian CD single
 "Swear It Again" (radio edit) – 4:04
 "Swear It Again" (Rokstone mix) – 4:07
 "Forever" – 5:05
 "Ronan Keating Interviews Westlife" (audio) – 3:36
 CD-ROM (includes filmed interview with Ronan Keating + video clips)

Australian and Japanese CD EP
 "Swear It Again" (radio edit) – 4:04
 "Until the End of Time" – 3:10
 "Forever" – 5:05
 "Everybody Knows" – 3:45
 "Let's Make Tonight Special" – 4:52
 "Don't Calm the Storm" – 3:46
 "Ronan Keating Interviews Westlife" (audio) – 3:37

Credits and personnel
Credits are lifted from the UK CD1 and Westlife liner notes.

Studio
 Engineered and programmed at Rokstone Studios (London, England)

Personnel

 Steve Mac – writing, all keyboards, production, mixing, vocal arrangement
 Wayne Hector – writing, vocal arrangement
 Paul Gendler – all guitars
 Richard Niles – string arrangement
 Chris Laws – engineering, programming
 Matt Howe – mix engineering
 Daniel Pursey – mixing assistant

Charts

Weekly charts

Year-end charts

Certifications and sales

Release history

References

1990s ballads
1998 songs
1999 debut singles
Arista Records singles
Bertelsmann Music Group singles
Irish Singles Chart number-one singles
Music videos directed by Nigel Dick
Music videos directed by Wayne Isham
Number-one singles in New Zealand
RCA Records singles
Song recordings produced by Steve Mac
Songs written by Steve Mac
Songs written by Wayne Hector
UK Singles Chart number-one singles
Westlife songs